The 2019–20 season was Valencia Basket's 34th in existence and the club's 24th consecutive season in the top flight of Spanish basketball and the fifth season in the EuroLeague. It was the second consecutive season under head coach Jaume Ponsarnau.

Times up to 26 October 2019 and from 29 March 2020 were CEST (UTC+2). Times from 27 October 2019 to 28 March 2020 were CET (UTC+1).

Players

Squad information

Transactions

In

|}

Out

|}

Pre-season and friendlies

Friendly matches

Trofeo Feria Ciudad de Albacete

Trofeo Ciutat de València

Competitions

Overview

Liga ACB

League table

Results summary

Results by round

Matches

Playoffs

Group stage

Semifinals

EuroLeague

League table

Results summary

Results by round

Matches

Copa del Rey

Quarterfinals

Semifinals

Supercopa de España

Semifinals

Statistics

Liga ACB

Source: ACB

EuroLeague

Source: EuroLeague

Copa del Rey

Source: ACB

Supercopa de España

Source: ACB

Notes

References

External links
 Official website

 
Valencia Basket
Valencia Basket